Noddy was a camera system used for generating idents for the BBC One and BBC Two television channels from late 1963 to February 1985.

The Noddy video camera was controlled by a servomotor to pan and tilt (or 'nod', hence the name Noddy) across a set of pre-arranged physical objects; captions and mechanical models. The camera was black-and-white, with colour electronically added to its output. This system eliminated the delay associated with swapping graphics upon a conventional copy stand. It also allowed for the depth required by mechanical objects such as clocks and a rotating globe.

History
The BBC first employed the system in the 1960s, before the advent of colour. The system's remote operation allowed the operator to control it with ease, and allowed the idents to be of no fixed length as the clock symbols could continue for many minutes at a time. A smaller black and white camera was introduced as camera technology progressed and, from 1969, a process was introduced to add colour signals to the camera output. This electronic addition of colour was convenient and made the networks' rebrands easy to perform.

BBC One mirrored globes
The most famous idents of the Noddy system were the BBC One mirrored globes used between 1969 and 1985, albeit with minor colour changes. The system consisted of an internally lit, rotating globe in front of a concave mirror. The oceans were painted onto the globe in metallic black paint, leaving the land masses as unpainted patches. The original globe ident introduced on 15 November 1969 featured blue continents and logo against a black background. The logo included the word 'COLOUR' after the BBC One (then BBC 1) corporate logo, to identify the new programme format and act as an advertisement to the vast majority of viewers who were still watching in black and white (as the colour version of the television licence, which financed the BBC, was much more expensive). Full colour broadcasts across the UK did not become available until 1976. The colours of blue and black were chosen because they were still easily distinguishable to those with black and white televisions. Another version of the globe without the 'COLOUR' logo was used before black-and-white programmes, of which there were still many in the BBC One schedule in the early 70s.

The globe ident was modified in January 1972 to include a new BBC logo with rounded corners and an italic serif font for the 'Colour' legend. On 28 December 1974 the ident was reworked further, with yellow continents over a dark blue background and the term 'COLOUR' removed. The legend BBC1 was rendered in white, using a heavy weight of the Futura typeface. On 5 September 1981, the display was altered to green continents over a dark blue background with a double striped BBC1 legend in white.

The globe model in the machinery was altered over the years as it had to be frequently re-painted. This led to a number of odd variations: the tip of South Africa, the Cape Fold Mountains was pointed in some 1981 models and the Pacific islands more pronounced in others.

In 2006, BBC1 aired Life on Mars, set in 1973; as part of the presentation the series trailed with a computer recreation of the 1973-era mirrored globe ident. BBC Wales, who produced the show, were able to use their original globe model to recreate the ident more faithfully, also including period appropriate dual language branding and continuity announcers from that era.

In 2014 the mirrored globe was added to the BBC's A History of the World object collection.

On 13 November 2017 the "1981" globe was returned for BBC Children in Need "Rocks the Eighties".

Other idents
A number of other presentational devices were used, the main one of these being the analogue clock. To allow enough light onto the model, a light was fixed onto the camera to shine onto the clock and other idents; this light was not used on the main ident however, which was internally lit; in any event, the mirrored background would have reflected the external light back at the camera and caused glare. The clock was mechanical, and featured numerals indicated by double lines that increased in thickness the further round the clockface. The clock also featured a 'polo' mint centre. The clock is quite distinctive, and became strongly associated with the BBC. The clock's colour and legend never differed from that of the main ident.

Following BBC2's 1979 rebrand to the electronic striped 2 ident, technicians started working on an electronic clock to accompany the 1981 new look, and in December 1981 it was this that replaced the mechanical version. The new clock featured a single uniform line thickness all the way round, except at 12, 3, 6 and 9 where the lines were doubled. The polo mint centre was also removed in favour of a central dot. However the electronic clock only launched in 1981 in England. Northern Ireland launched an electronic clock in 1984 but Wales and Scotland retained the mechanical clock until the launch of the next BBC1 ident in 1985.

The looks were also accompanied by static programme captions. The captions for the 1969 to 1974 look used the legend of the ident at the bottom of the screen. They continued for a while after the new BBC1 logo was introduced. However, the style was changed in 1976 to feature a banner at the top of the image featuring double striped lines and the double striped BBC1 logo that would only feature on the main ident 5 years later. This design was used until February 1985.

Christmas idents

Replacement
The mirrored globe was retired at 7 p.m. on 18 February 1985, with the first showing of the globe's replacement: the Computer Originated World or COW for short. The globe was retired because of the fact it was the only live mechanical model used on television and the maintenance required was making it difficult to use; even the 1981 rebrand caused a number of difficulties such as bad positioning, odd colours and other errors. For example, on the ident's first two days, the blue colour was a very dark navy, and the continents were pale yellow-green, in which they were supposed to be dark blue and green, which was due to a severe problem with the colour scheme, in addition, for its first nine months, the ident was modified a few times. The globe was also becoming old fashioned, due to its long service since the introduction of colour.

The Noddy system was abandoned with the globe, as all idents and clocks were now electronically generated, and as a result the equipment was not needed. Programme slides remained the exception; slide scanners were still used for the live origination of programme slides until the late 1980s, when the programme slides then became stored electronically and generated with the Quantel Paintbox.

The logo's last appearance was at 5:35pm on Monday 18 February, introducing a new series of Grange Hill, although viewers in London would see it one more time, before London Plus at 6:35pm, making this its true final appearance.

NODD
The acronym NODD was first recorded in a web forum related to TV presentation, where an author unconnected with the BBC claimed it stood for Nexus Orthicon Display Device. However, the term is not recognised among the many surviving Presentation and Engineering staff who worked with the system and internal BBC paperwork of the era specifically refers to the camera system as "Noddy".

Presentation's "Noddy" camera also had a companion, originally named "Big Ears", which was a dual monochrome slide scanner, thus allowing in-vision changes between slides. With the advent of colour this was replaced with a Rank Cintel slide scanner, electronically similar to a flying spot telecine machine.

References

External links

1969 idents at TVARK
TVARK Feature on how the NODD works, 1974 BBC1 idents
TVARK 1981 idents

Television technology
Television presentation in the United Kingdom
BBC history
BBC One
BBC Idents
BBC Television logos
British inventions